The Arikaree River is a  river in the central Great Plains of North America.  It lies mostly in the American state of Colorado, draining land between the North and South Forks of the Republican River, and it flows into the North Fork in Nebraska after flowing a short distance through Kansas. It is a designated area within the Colorado Natural Areas Program to protect native and uncommon species that may be endangered or threatened.

Name
The river is named after the Arikara Native Americans, whose name refers to "horn".

Geography
The source of the Arikaree River is in extreme eastern Elbert County, Colorado on the western edge of the High Plains region of the Great Plains. From there, the river flows generally northeast across the High Plains in eastern Colorado. It then crosses the extreme northwestern corner of Kansas before entering far southwestern Nebraska. At the town of Haigler, the Arikaree joins with the North Fork Republican River to form the Republican River.

It holds the distinction of being the highest low point of any U.S. state, higher than the highest points of 18 states and the District of Columbia.

History
Along the river is the site of the 1868 Battle of Beecher Island.

Arikaree River Natural Area
The Arikaree River has been made one of the designated areas under the Colorado Natural Areas Program because it is "part of the largest and best remaining example of a naturally functioning Great Plains river system in Colorado." It has several species of reptiles, fish, and amphibians that are native and uncommon. The area is a sanctuary for many bird species, including burrowing owls, ferruginous hawks, and greater prairie chickens. The habitat is near-pristine and there are high-quality riparian and native prairie plants.

See also

 Arikaree Breaks
 Beecher Island
 List of Colorado rivers
 List of Kansas rivers
 List of Nebraska rivers

References

External links

 Arikaree River - lowest point in Colorado

Lowest points of U.S. states
Rivers of Colorado
Rivers of Kansas
Rivers of Nebraska
Bodies of water of Dundy County, Nebraska
Tributaries of the Kansas River
Rivers of Lincoln County, Colorado
Bodies of water of Cheyenne County, Kansas
Rivers of Yuma County, Colorado